Christopher Orr MBE RA (born 8 April 1943) is an English artist and printmaker who has exhibited worldwide and published over 400 limited edition prints in lithography, etching and silkscreen.

Orr was born in Islington, London. After studying at Ravensbourne and Hornsey Schools of Art, he graduated from the Royal College of Art in 1967 with an MA in printmaking. He was made a fellow of the Royal College of Art in 1985, a fellow of the Royal Society of Painter Printmakers in 1988, elected Royal Academician in 1995 and appointed professor of printmaking at The Royal College of Art 1998. Combining his work as a full-time artist with teaching, he has also taught at Cardiff College of Art, Central St Martins, London, and at the Royal College of Art, London.

His work is best described in his own words "During my thirty nine years as an artist I have been put in various pigeon-holes, such as 'quintessential English' or a 'latter-day Hogarth'. But are these epithets reasonable? My pictures are composed of well-mixed metaphors, references, allusions jokes and descriptions. Does 'Chris Orr-like' refer to a typically English muddle? The tradition of graphic eccentricity (Heath Robinson, Donald McGill, Steve Bell et al.) is fair enough, I am happy to acknowledge many influences in this area."

Orr has had many one-man shows internationally, including Britain, France, America, Australia, Japan and China. He is represented by the Jill George Gallery, where he has been regularly exhibited since 1978.

He was appointed Member of the Order of the British Empire (MBE) in the 2008 Birthday Honours.

Selected exhibitions 
1971 Serpentine Gallery, London
1976 Whitechapel Gallery and Museum of Modern Art Oxford
1980 Galleria Grafica, Tokyo, Japan
1983 Jay Street Gallery, New York, US
1987 Print Guild, Melbourne, Australia
1990 Royal Festival Hall London
1994 Jill George Gallery
1996 Jill George Gallery
1998 Royal College of Art
1999 Royal Academy of Arts (Friends Room)
2001 Lewis Elton Gallery, University of Surrey, Guildford
2003 Jill George Gallery
2004 Ruskin Library, Lancaster
2005 Six Royal Academicians, Beijing and Shanghai
2012 LithORRgraphy: Chris Orr and the Art of Chemical Printing, at Royal Academy of Arts

Public collections 
Arts Council of Great Britain
Arts Council of Wales
British Council
Royal Academy of Arts
Museum of London
Victoria & Albert Museum
Science Museum (London)
The British Museum
Ulster Folk and Transport Museum
National Railway Museum, York
Government Art Collection
Tate Gallery
The Ruskin Library Lancaster University

Publications 
Many Mansions, Chris Orr and Michael Palin, 1990
The Small Titanic, Chris Orr and Kevin Whately,1994. London: Pinko Productions 
Happy Days, Chris Orr, 1999
Semi-Antics, Chris Orr and Jill George, 2001
 The Multitude Diaries, Chris Orr, 2008. London: Royal Academy of Arts. 
 The Making of Things, Chris Orr and Robert Hewison. Foreword by Michael Palin. London: Royal Academy of Arts (2013).

References

External links 
 Chris Orr's Website
 Chris Orr's John Ruskin, and other stories Ruskin Library, Lancaster 2004
 Royal Academy - Chris Orr

1943 births
Living people
English printmakers
Royal Academicians
Alumni of the Royal College of Art
Academics of the Royal College of Art
Members of the Order of the British Empire